The Marble Palace (Kākh-e Marmar) is an historic building and former royal residence in Tehran, Iran. It is located in the city centre, but the location was a quiet quarter of Tehran when the palace was erected.

History

The property in which the Marble Palace is situated used to belong to Prince Abbas Mirza Farman Farmaian, and contained his private residences and office. Upon ascension to the throne, Reza Shah, whom had previously been a sentry guard at the property confiscated it from the Farmanfarmaian family and evicted the family of Abbas Mirza Farman Farmaian in less than 24 hours. The demolition of the earlier buildings took place shortly thereafter.

The Marble Palace was built between 1934 and 1937. It was constructed on the orders of Reza Shah by French engineer Joseph Leon and Iranian architect Fat'hollah Firdaws. It was originally built to host official functions and receptions.

The palace was used by Reza Shah and then his son Mohammad Reza Shah as their residence. Reza Shah and his fourth spouse Esmat Dowlatshahi lived at the palace with their five children until Reza Shah's exile in 1941. Reza Shah signed his letter of abdication at the palace in September 1941. 

Numerous significant royal events occurred during the reign of Mohammad Reza Shah. It was one of his two significant palaces in addition to Golestan Palace. The Marble palace was identified with the Shah's persona in the 1950s. The palace hosted all three marriage ceremonies of the Shah. The Iranian wedding ceremony of the Shah and his first spouse, Princess Fawzia, was held at the palace in 1939, and it was their residence until their divorce in 1945. 

In October 1950, the betrothal ceremony and in February 1951, the wedding ceremony of the Shah and his second spouse, Soraya Esfandiary, were held at the palace. Both betrothal and marriage of the Shah to his third wife, Farah Diba, also occurred at the palace. Shahnaz Pahlavi, daughter of the Shah and Princess Fawzia, also wed Ardeshir Zahedi at the palace in October 1957. In addition, the palace hosted the Shah's 48th birthday party. 

Besides these events the Shah also survived an assassination attempt at the palace on 10 April 1965 perpetrated by an Iranian soldier. Following this event which is known as the Marble Palace Plot the palace was no longer in use and was made a museum in 1970.

Style and technical features
The design of the two story palace was first developed by Ostad Jafar Khan. However, final sketch was produced by Ostad Haidar Khan. The overall architectural style of the palace is eclectic, combining Eastern, including Qajar architectural features, and Western architectural styles. 

The palace is surrounded by a garden. The external surface of the palace is of white marble. The stone entrance of the palace where two statues of Achaemenid soldiers holding arrows were erected particularly reflects eclectic architectural style. These statues were carved by Iranian artist Jafar Khan. The palace has other gates which were made by local craftsmen from different provinces. The palace is covered by a huge dome that is a replica of the Sheikh Lotfollah mosque in Isfahan. The dome is covered by arabesque tiles with scroll-like patterns.

The internal area of the palace is highly formal with heavily carved doors and extremely high ceilings. The palace has a very large reception room where mirrors are used like in many mosques and holy shrines in the country. The room is known as "Hall of Mirrors". The interior of the palace was furnished by rich fabrics and rugs. Decorations were made by Iranian architect Hossein Lorzadeh. The tiles used at the palace were produced by Ostad Yazdi and paintings by Ostad Behzad.

Current usage
After the 1979 Islamic revolution in Iran, the palace was used as a museum until 1981. Then it was given to the expediency discernment council. Local people reported that the palace had been used by the senior politicians in the Islamic Republic of Iran. The historical items used at the palace, including furniture, are being exhibited at the decorative arts museum in Tehran. The palace had been close to the public until July 2020 when it was redesigned as the museum of arts following its acquisition by the Mostazafan Foundation in 2019.

Gallery

References

External links

1937 establishments in Iran
Buildings and structures in Tehran
Houses completed in 1937
Palaces in Tehran
Royal residences in Iran